In British, Australian, Bermudian, Hong Kong and Irish company law (and previously New Zealand), a company limited by guarantee (CLG) is a type of corporation used primarily but not exclusively for non-profit organisations that require legal personality. A company limited by guarantee does not usually have a share capital or shareholders, but instead has members who act as guarantors of the company's liabilities: each member undertakes to contribute an amount specified in the articles (typically very small) in the event of insolvency or of the winding up of the company.

A company limited by guarantee can distribute its profits to its members, if allowed to by its articles of association, but then it would not be eligible for charitable status.

Like a private company limited by shares, a company limited by guarantee must include the suffix "Limited" in its name, except in circumstances specifically excluded by law.  One condition of this exclusion is that the company does not distribute profits.

Until 1981, it was possible in the United Kingdom to form a company limited by guarantee with share capital. Under section 5 of the Companies Act 2006, new companies cannot be formed as a company limited by guarantee with a share capital.

Uses

Some uses of companies limited by guarantee include clubs, membership organisations, including students' unions, residential property management companies, sports associations (such as the PGA European Tour), workers' co-operatives, other social enterprise, non-governmental organizations (NGOs) and charities (such as Oxfam), and at least one political party (the UK Independence Party). The railway infrastructure provider Network Rail, domain name registry Nominet UK, England and Wales Cricket Board and IXPs LINX (London Internet Exchange), and LONAP (London Access Point) are also companies limited by guarantee. Australia and Hong Kong also have companies limited by guarantee, Cricket Australia and the World Wide Fund for Nature Hong Kong being examples.

Commercial enterprises
One of the largest companies limited by guarantee is Bupa, the healthcare company, which has 32 million customers in more than 190 countries and which employs more than 84,000 people around the world.

A number of professional services providers are structured as private companies limited by guarantee in which the members that provide client-facing services are the individual constituent firms using a common brand. The company limited by guarantee typically does not itself provide client-facing services. The Big Four accountancy firms (Deloitte, Ernst & Young, KPMG, and PriceWaterhouseCoopers) are each organized using this structure.

Some law firms also use this structure to establish an internationally branded presence. For example, the Anglo-Canadian law firm of Gowling WLG, formed in 2016, is structured as an English private company limited by guarantee (named Gowling WLG International Limited), in which the two limited liability partnerships of Gowling WLG (Canada) LLP and Gowling WLG (UK) LLP are members and provide legal services; the structure is similar to the Swiss Verein structure used by several other major international law firms. In another example, the Anglo-American law firm of Womble Bond Dickinson is similarly structured, with two limited liability partnerships of Womble Bond Dickinson (UK) LLP and Womble Bond Dickinson (US) LLP being the members and providing client-facing services.

References

External links
UK Office of Public Sector Information: Companies Act 2006.

 01
Privately held companies
Social economy in the United Kingdom
Types of business entity
Companies of Northern Ireland
.
 01
 01

de:Aktiengesellschaft (Vereinigtes Königreich)#Private company limited by guarantee